Daviesia gracilis is a species of flowering plant in the family Fabaceae and is endemic to the south-west of Western Australia. It is an open, spreading shrub with its phyllodes reduced to scales, and has orange-yellow and maroon flowers.

Description

Taxonomy and naming
Daviesia gracilis was first formally described in 1984 by Michael Crisp in the journal Nuytsia from specimens collected by Archibald Menzies at King George Sound in 1791. The specific epithet (gracilis) means "thin or slender".

Distribution and habitat
This daviesia grows in heath or open woodland between Kojonup, King George Sound and Bremer Bay in the Esperance Plains and Jarrah Forest regions of south-western Western Australia.

Conservation status
Daviesia gracilis is listed as "not threatened" by the Department of Biodiversity, Conservation and Attractions.

References

gracilis
Eudicots of Western Australia
Plants described in 1984
Taxa named by Michael Crisp